Nationally significant infrastructure projects (NSIP) are major infrastructure developments in England and Wales that bypass normal local planning requirements. These include proposals for power plants, large renewable energy projects, new airports and airport extensions, and major road projects. The NSIP nomenclature began to be used in 2008, and since April 2012 these projects have been managed by the Planning Inspectorate.

History
Nationally significant infrastructure projects were initially controlled by the Infrastructure Planning Commission (IPC) which was established by the Planning Act 2008, which began operating on 1 October 2009 on an advice and guidance basis. Full powers of the IPC to receive, examine and approve applications for development consent came into force on 1 March 2010.

The IPC was abolished by the Localism Act 2011 which transferred decision-making powers created by the 2008 Act to the relevant Secretary of State. Since 1 April 2012, acceptance and examination of applications for development consent is dealt with by a new Infrastructure Planning Unit within the Planning Inspectorate.

Procedure

Nationally significant infrastructure projects are given planning permission via a Development Consent Order. The Planning Act 2008 created a new regime for development consent for certain types of nationally significant infrastructure, including but not limited to nuclear and wind energy, airports, harbour and water waste projects. This new regime was intended to replace the traditional planning system and managed to reduce uncertainty around NSIPS by introducing Development Consent Orders which were aimed towards increasing efficiency by reducing the amount of consent regimes required to meet development consent as the old system required approval over several pieces of legislation. One example would be that the Sizewell B nuclear power station required consent under several pieces of legislation including Section 2 of the Electric Lighting Act 1909 and planning permission in Section 40 of the Town and Country Planning Act. This was amended under Part 4 of the Planning Act 2008 where this new process would require a Development Consent Order. This is an application for approval to construct a NSIP which is dealt with by the Planning Inspectorate who recommends the application to the Secretary of State whom in turn has the authority to decide upon whether development should go ahead. Prior to the introduction of the Planning Act 2008, it was apparent that the town and planning system was not a "one-size fits all" solution when it came to major Infrastructure projects such as Heathrow Terminal 5 which had planning permission granted eight years after the inquiry was submitted. The introduction of the Planning Act was seen as more successful than the previous regime by most accounts as it managed to reduce costs associated with the inefficient planning system by taking a more front-loaded approach such as the unification of the consent regime, introduction of National Policy Statements and introduction of a fixed timetable for the various stages of the application.

Criticisms of the new procedure 

The new procedure was criticized in various ways; one such criticism was that past the application stage, there was very little room for amendment. This could potentially be expensive and time-consuming if amendments to a Development Consent Order would be made. This non-material change had been crucial to the construction of the wind turbines and had it not been approved, the entire nationally significant project would have been financially unviable. This reluctance for the approval of material amendments was strictly in line with the vigorous pre-consultation requirements under part 4 of the Planning Act 2008 which many criticisms were also directed towards. A report published by the Ministry of Housing detailing a post-implementation review of the new planning system has shown that there hasn't been any applications for a "material change" yet.   

Common criticisms were directed towards the extensive pre-consultation requirements which meant that applications would take a long time to prepare as it takes two and a half months for consultation with the local authorities, the local community and statutory consulates before an application could be approved. An example would be the need for public consultation as the Planning Act 2008 requires that all applications for a Development Consent Order must follow the National Policy Statements, and during the pre-application process Section 47 requires the applicant to prepare a statement regarding how they propose to consult the local community. However, local residents revealed that pre-application consultation fell within the range of 'poor' to 'very poor' and a prominent critique was that communication between local authorities and the local community was too one sided and developers were reluctant to engage with local opinions and dialogue.

Amendments

Planning Act 2008 
Prior to the introduction of the Planning Act 2008, consents were often required under two or three pieces of legislation for a single project. The need for several different pieces of legislation to achieve planning consent meant that attempting to gain planning approval often lead to delay, uncertainty and frustration. The introduction of the Planning Act 2008 managed to remove the need for other consent regimes providing a "one stop shop" to receive consent instead of having to go to several bodies. Part 4 of the Planning Act 2008 states that Nationally Significant Infrastructure Projects will require a Development Consent Order, eliminating the need to seek approval under different regimes.

Localism Act 2011 
The Localism Act 2011, which received royal assent on 15 November 2011, introduced further reforms towards the planning process for nationally significant infrastructure projects.  The Localism Act 2011 reduced the number of local authorities that need to be consulted during the pre-application stage. In addition, the requirement that community consultation had to be published in a local newspaper was removed. This addressed some common complaints towards the planning process, which included that the pre-consultation requirements for nationally significant infrastructure projects were too onerous and time-consuming.

References 

 
Town and country planning in England
Town and country planning in Wales
United Kingdom industrial planning policy